Forest of the Hanged is a novel by Romanian writer Liviu Rebreanu. Published in 1922, it is partly inspired by the experience of his brother Emil Rebreanu, an officer in the Austro-Hungarian Army hanged for espionage and desertion in 1917, during World War I.

The novel was made into a film in 1965. The film was directed by Liviu Ciulei, who won the award for Best Director at the 1965 Cannes Film Festival. Composer Carmen Petra Basacopol created in 1988–1990 an opera titled  Apostol Bologa, op. 58, which was inspired by this novel.

Plot
The protagonist is Lieutenant Apostol Bologa, who was born and raised in Parva - then Párva, Beszterce-Naszód County, Transylvania, Kingdom of Hungary. Although he was enrolled in the Philosophy Faculty of the University of Budapest, and he had not been conscripted into the army since he was a widow's son, Bologa volunteers into the Austro-Hungarian Army at the start of World War I. He does that both from a youthful ambition to prove his bravery in front of his fiancée, Marta Domșa, who was enchanted by the military uniforms of the Hungarian officers, as well as from the social views he had acquired in Hungarian schools. After attending artillery school, he is sent to the front. He fights valiantly in Italy and Galicia; wounded twice in the next two years, he is promoted to the rank of lieutenant and decorated three times. Bologa contributes (by his vote in court) at the sentencing to death of a Czech officer, second lieutenant Svoboda, who had deserted the Austro-Hungarian army. 

The novel follows his soul metamorphosis, under the influence of the Czech captain Otto Klapka, who seeds in his heart the hatred against the Austrian empire and the love for the Romanian nation. Sent on the Romanian front, in the Eastern Carpathians, the thought of desertion becomes an obsession for him. Being forced again to take part in a military tribunal, to judge a Romanian peasant for espionage, Apostol Bologa starts in the night towards the Romanian lines, to get to his blood brothers. He is caught and hanged, in much the same way as the Czech that he had helped condemn. At the gallows, his confessor recites, "Receive, o Lord, the soul of Thy servant Apostol".

Editions and translations
. București: Cartea Românească. 1922
. Praha: Šolc a Šimáček. 1928. Translation: Marie Kojecko-Korickova
. London: Allen et Co., New York: Duffield & Co. 1930. Translation: Alice V. Wise. , 
. Perugia, Venezia: . 1930. Translation: Enzo Loretti 
. Kraków: Wydawnictwa Literacko-Naukowego. 1931. 
. Paris: Éditions Perrin. 1932. Translation: B. Madeleine, Léon Thévenin, André Bellesort
. Cernăuți: Der Tag, 1932. Translation:  Ernst Carabăț
. Rotterdam. 1932. Translation: Jules Verbegke
. Kraków. 1934. Translation: Stanislav Lukasik
. 1938. Translation: Imre Somogyi 
. Istanbul: İnsel Kitabevi. 1942. Translation:  Ziya Yamaç; Umut Toprakları, Ayrıntı Yayınevi,  2019. Translation: Gülen Aktaş. 
. Madrid: Stylos. 1944. Translation:  Maria Teresa Quiroga Plá, Luis Landinez
. Stockholm: Bonnier. 1944. Translation: Ingeborg Essen
. Lisbon: Gleba, 1945. Translation: Celestino Gomes, Victor Buescu 
. Helsinki: Suomen kirja, 1946. Translation: Lauri Ikonen 
. București: Editura de literatură în limbă străine, 1958. Translation: Olga Crușevan 
. Kishinev: Kartia Moldoveniaske, 1960. Vasili Sugoniai 
. Athens: Kedros. 1961. Translation: Kosmas Politis, Maria Dimitriadis-Papaioanu
. Sofia: Narodna Kultura. 1962. Translation:  Gergana Stratieva 
. Bratislava: Slov. vydav. krásnej lit. 1965. Translation: Peter Doval
. Cairo. 1967. Translation: Fauzi Sáhín
. Ljubljana: , 1976. Translation: Katja Špur
 Kiev: Dnipro, 1990; Translation: Ivan Kushniruk
. Tokyo: Kobunsha. 1997. Translation:

Notes

References
Cezar Apreotesei, "Date noi despre prototipul lui Apostol Bologa", Orizont, vol. XV, nr. 7, July 1964.
Gheorghe Bogdan-Duică, "Discuții literare. "Pădurea spânzuraților" de Liviu Rebreanu”, Societatea de mâine, revistă săptămânală pentru probleme sociale și economice, Cluj, vol. I, nr. 4, 4 May 1924, p. 92.
Octav Botez, "Liviu Rebreanu: "Pădurea spânzuraților"", Viața Românească, Iași, vol. XV, nr. 7, July 1923.
 Maria-Nicoleta Ciocian, "Pădurea Spânzuraților or the Multifaceted Dimension of Love", Acta Universitatis Sapientiae, Philologica, vol. I, nr. 1, 2009, pp. 164-169.
Șerban Cioculescu, "În marginea operei d-lui Liviu Rebreanu", Revista Fundațiilor Regale, vol. III, nr. 2, February 1936, pp. 412-423.
Pompiliu Constantinescu, "Liviu Rebreanu: Ion, Pădurea spânzuraților, Ciuleandra", Opere și autori, Editura Ancora, București, 1928, pp. 112-120.
Gyula Dávid, "Apostol Bologa útja és útvesztői", Korunk, vol. XXVII, nr. 11, November 1968, pp. 1616-1620.
Dana Dumitru, "Lumea văzută astfel", România Literară, vol. IV, nr. 37, 3 September 1971.

1922 novels
Novels set during World War I
Psychological novels
Novels set in Romania
Romanian novels adapted into films